The 1869 Salisbury by-election was fought on 5 August 1869.  The by-election was fought due to the resignation of the incumbent MP of the Liberal Party, Edward William Terreck Hamilton.  It was won by the Liberal candidate Alfred Seymour.

References

Politics of Salisbury
1869 elections in the United Kingdom
1869 in England
By-elections to the Parliament of the United Kingdom in Wiltshire constituencies
19th century in Wiltshire
August 1869 events